Agdistis bouyeri is a moth of the family Pterophoroidea. It is found in Angola.

The wingspan is 15–17 mm.  The moth flies from January to February.

External links
Ten new species of Afrotropical Pterophoridae (Lepidoptera)

Endemic fauna of Angola
Agdistinae
Insects of Angola
Moths of Africa
Taxa named by Cees Gielis
Moths described in 2008